Oliver Cyril Spencer Watson VC DSO (7 September 1876 – 28 March 1918) was an English posthumous recipient of the Victoria Cross, the highest and most prestigious award for gallantry in the face of the enemy that can be awarded to British and Commonwealth forces.

Biography 
Educated at St Paul's School, London, and the Royal Military College, Sandhurst, in 1897 Watson was commissioned into the Green Howards and posted to the regiment's 2nd battalion, then serving in India. He took part in the Tirah Expedition of 1897-1898 on the North West Frontier, in which he was severely wounded, and saw action again in the Boxer Rebellion of 1900. He was promoted Lieutenant in 1898 and after being invalided from India in 1903 he retired to the reserve of regular officers in 1904. In 1909 he joined the County of London Yeomanry (Middlesex, Duke of Cambridge's Hussars). He was promoted Lieutenant in 1911, Captain in 1913. He served in Gallipoli in April 1915 and was promoted to Major in July 1915, before returning to the UK. Attached to the 2/5th King's Own Yorkshire Light Infantry from his Yeomanry unit in 1916, he went to France as the second-in-command in 1917. He was Mentioned in Despatches and awarded the DSO in May 1917, having been wounded at Bullecourt on 3 May 1917.

Victoria Cross
Watson was 41 years old, and an Acting Lieutenant-Colonel commanding the 5th Battalion, King's Own Yorkshire Light Infantry (now part of The Rifles) during the First World War when the following deed took place for which he was awarded the VC.

On 28 March 1918 at Rossignol Wood, north of Hebuterne, France, a counter-attack had been made against the enemy position which at first achieved its object, but as they were holding out in two improvised strong-points, Lieutenant Colonel Watson saw that immediate action was necessary and he led his remaining small reserve to the attack, organising bombing parties and leading attacks under intense fire. Outnumbered, he finally ordered his men to retire, remaining himself in a communication trench to cover the retirement. The assault he led was at a critical moment and without doubt saved the line, but he was killed covering the withdrawal.

Lieutenant Colonel Watson has no known grave. He is remembered at the CWGC Cemetery at Arras, France and listed under the Middlesex Hussars (Yeomanry); his parent unit.

In 1956, Watson's medals were loaned to the Green Howards Regimental Museum, then in 1992 were donated as a gift to the Regiment by the husband of Watson's niece, Mrs Catherine Whittuck. A copy of his Victoria Cross is displayed at the Green Howards Museum, Richmond, North Yorkshire.

References

Monuments to Courage (David Harvey, 1999)
The Register of the Victoria Cross (This England, 1997)
VCs of the First World War - Spring Offensive 1918 (Gerald Gliddon, 1997)

External links
 CWGC entry
 Biography at The Friends of the Green Howards
 Masonic Roll of Honour

1876 births
1918 deaths
People from Westminster
Graduates of the Royal Military College, Sandhurst
People educated at St Paul's School, London
Green Howards officers
King's Own Yorkshire Light Infantry officers
British military personnel of the Tirah campaign
Companions of the Distinguished Service Order
British Army personnel of World War I
British World War I recipients of the Victoria Cross
British military personnel killed in World War I
British Army personnel of the Boxer Rebellion
British Army recipients of the Victoria Cross
Middlesex Yeomanry officers
Military personnel from London
Missing in action of World War I